The 2000 Atlanta Falcons season was the franchise's 35th season in the National Football League (NFL). The Falcons offense scored 252 points while the defense gave up 413 points. It was Jessie Tuggle’s 14th and final season with the Falcons, before being waived in the 2001 off-season. He subsequently retired. As for the rest of the team, Atlanta failed to improve upon its 5–11 record from 1999; instead they finished the season 4–12 and missed the playoffs for the second consecutive season after reaching Super Bowl XXXIII in 1998. 

The last remaining active members of the 2000 Atlanta Falcons were linebacker Keith Brooking and offensive lineman Todd McClure, who both retired after the 2012 season.

Offseason

Signings

Departures

NFL Draft

Undrafted free agents

Personnel

Staff

Roster

Preseason

Regular season

Schedule

Standings

Awards and records
Terance Mathis, Franchise Record, Most Receptions in One Season, 111 Receptions  (Broken by Roddy White in 2010)

References

External links
 2000 Atlanta Falcons at Pro-Football-Reference.com

Atlanta Falcons
Atlanta Falcons seasons
Atlanta